"That's What Life Is All About" is a 1975 song recorded by Bing Crosby. It was originally written by Peter Dacre (lyrics) and Les Reed (music). Later, Crosby re-wrote the lyrics with Ken Barnes.

Background
Crosby recorded the song on February 19, 1975 at Chappells in London with the Pete Moore Orchestra. The session was produced by Ken Barnes. It was included on the album That's What Life Is All About.

Charts
The song was released as a single by United Artists, and the recording peaked at no. 35 in the U.S. on the Billboard Easy Listening chart, also reaching no. 41 in the UK Singles Chart.

Performances
Crosby used the song in his various concerts in 1976, including at the London Palladium (June 21–July 4, 1976), as well as promoting the song on television shows such as Parkinson, The Vera Lynn Show, Stars on Sunday and Top of the Pops. The version sung at the Palladium was captured on the album Bing Crosby Live at the London Palladium.

References

Sources
Grudens, Richard (2002). Bing Crosby – Crooner of the Century. Celebrity Profiles Publishing Co.. .
Macfarlane, Malcolm. Bing Crosby – Day By Day. Scarecrow Press, 2001.
Osterholm, J. Roger. Bing Crosby: A Bio-Bibliography. Greenwood Press, 1994.

1975 songs
Bing Crosby songs
Songs written by Les Reed (songwriter)